Rodriguez Camp is a census-designated place (CDP) in Tulare County, California. The 2010 United States census reported Rodriguez Camp's population was 156.

Geography
According to the United States Census Bureau, the CDP covers an area of 0.3 square miles (0.7 km), all of it land.

Demographics
At the 2010 census Rodriguez Camp had a population of 156. The racial makeup of Rodriguez Camp was 51 (32.7%) White, 0 (0.0%) African American, 0 (0.0%) Native American, 0 (0.0%) Asian, 0 (0.0%) Pacific Islander, 98 (62.8%) from other races, and 7 (4.5%) from two or more races. Hispanic or Latino of any race were 151 people (96.8%).

The whole population lived in households, no one lived in non-institutionalized group quarters and no one was institutionalized.

There were 34 households, 30 (88.2%) had children under the age of 18 living in them, 21 (61.8%) were opposite-sex married couples living together, 7 (20.6%) had a female householder with no husband present, 5 (14.7%) had a male householder with no wife present.  There were 5 (14.7%) unmarried opposite-sex partnerships, and 0 (0%) same-sex married couples or partnerships. 1 households (2.9%) were one person and 1 (2.9%) had someone living alone who was 65 or older. The average household size was 4.59.  There were 33 families (97.1% of households); the average family size was 4.52.

The age distribution was 71 people (45.5%) under the age of 18, 27 people (17.3%) aged 18 to 24, 45 people (28.8%) aged 25 to 44, 11 people (7.1%) aged 45 to 64, and 2 people (1.3%) who were 65 or older.  The median age was 19.1 years. For every 100 females, there were 110.8 males.  For every 100 females age 18 and over, there were 123.7 males.

There were 34 housing units at an average density of 129.1 per square mile, of the occupied units 0 (0%) were owner-occupied and 34 (100%) were rented. The homeowner vacancy rate was 0%; the rental vacancy rate was 0%.  0 people (0% of the population) lived in owner-occupied housing units and 156 people (100%) lived in rental housing units.

References

Census-designated places in Tulare County, California
Census-designated places in California